The Nedbank Cup is a South African club football (soccer) tournament. The knockout tournament, based on the English FA Cup format, was one of a weak opponent facing a stronger one. The competition was sponsored by ABSA until 2007, after which Nedbank took over sponsorship.

Results

First round

Second round

Third round

Quarter-finals

Semi-finals

Final

External links
Nedbank Cup Official Website

Notes and references

2015–16 domestic association football cups
2015–16 in South African soccer
2015-16